The World Movement for Nonviolence was founded in 1998 by Bawa Jain, follower of Acharya Sushil Kumarji Maharaj, began presenting the Gandhi-King Award in 1999. The organization has forged partnerships and alliances in over 60 countries and also hosts special programs at the UN.

References
https://web.archive.org/web/20100523092656/http://www.millenniumpeacesummit.com/wc_awards.html

Nonviolence